Break Out is the tenth studio album by American female vocal group the Pointer Sisters, released on November 6, 1983, on Planet Records, distributed by RCA Records. It is the Pointer Sisters' most successful album to date, peaking at number eight on the Billboard 200 and being certified triple-platinum by the RIAA.

Overview
Featuring mostly electro dance tunes, the album gave the Pointer Sisters the biggest success of their recording career, spawning four U.S. top 10 hits—"Jump (For My Love)", "Automatic", "Neutron Dance" and a slightly remixed version of their 1982 hit "I'm So Excited". The latter was included on later editions of the album in the place of the track "Nightline". "Automatic" also became the group's biggest UK hit, peaking at No. 2 and certified "Silver" by the BPI. "Jump" also made the UK top 10, peaking at No. 6.

With the remix of "I'm So Excited" added to pressings of the album in mid-1984, a total of six singles were issued from Break Out. The first release was "I Need You", featuring shared lead vocals by the three Pointer Sisters. A mid-tempo number, it was atypical of the album's overall dance sound; the choice of the song as lead single was based on producer Richard Perry's hope that the track would reinstate the Pointer Sisters' presence at R&B radio. "I Need You" did become a major hit on the Billboard R&B chart but did not reach the Top 40 of the Billboard Hot 100, stalling at No. 48.

The dance track "Jump (For My Love)" (titled simply "Jump" on the first version of the album), with June Pointer on lead, was intended to be the second single from Break Out; however, another dance track, "Automatic", was substituted in its place, after garnering heavy airplay on radio and in dance clubs as an album track. The first major hit to feature the distinctive contralto of Ruth Pointer on lead, "Automatic" became the first Top 40 hit from Break Out, its No. 5 peak ending a three-year absence by the Pointer Sisters from the Top 10 of the Hot 100. "Automatic" also became the most successful R&B hit by the Pointer Sisters as a trio—its No. 2 R&B peak was bested by "How Long (Betcha' Got a Chick on the Side)", a 1975 No. 1 R&B hit by the group in its original four-woman format. "Jump (For My Love)" was afforded a single release as the follow-up to "Automatic" and, with a No. 3 peak, became the most successful single from Break Out.

The re-release of "I'm So Excited"—the one single from Break Out to feature a lead vocal by Anita Pointer, who sang lead on most Pointer Sisters hits—resulted in a third consecutive Top Ten hit for the group, peaking at No. 9. Prior to Break Out, the Pointers had accumulated three earlier Top 10 hits over a 12-year recording career. After the Break Out track "Neutron Dance", with Ruth Pointer on lead vocal, was optioned for the soundtrack of the 1984 film Beverly Hills Cop, it became the album's fifth single and fourth consecutive Top Ten hit, reaching No. 6 on the Hot 100 in February 1985. A sixth single, "Baby, Come and Get It", featuring June Pointer on lead, became a minor hit in the spring of 1985 (No. 44 Hot 100/No. 24 R&B).

"Nightline", the track dropped from Break Out as originally formatted to allow inclusion of "I'm So Excited", was originally written for and recorded by Michael Jackson but was never released, although a leaked recording has been circulating for many years. The Pointer Sisters' version was utilized as the B-side of the "Automatic" single.

Break Out sold over three million copies in the U.S. and won the group two Grammy Awards and two American Music Awards. The 1983 original release and the 1984 re-release were both remastered and issued in a deluxe expanded edition with bonus tracks on CD in 2011 by Big Break Records.

According to Ruth Pointer, she and her sisters were not happy with the title Break Out. "We kept thinking of it as a rash or jail", she said.

Track listing

Original 1983 release

1984 re-release

Personnel 

The Pointer Sisters
 Anita Pointer – lead vocals (4, 7, 9, 10), backing vocals
 June Pointer – lead vocals (1, 3, 4, 8), backing vocals
 Ruth Pointer – lead vocals (2, 4-6), backing vocals

Musicians

 Howie Rice – Minimoog (1, 5, 9, 10), additional synthesizers (1), electronic drums (1, 3, 8), synthesizers (2-6, 9, 10), guitar (4, 6-8), bass (4), drum machine programming (4, 6, 10), percussion (4, 6, 8, 10), E-mu Emulator (6), acoustic piano (6), organ (6)
 Stephen Mitchell – synthesizers (1, 2, 4), synthesizer programming (1, 5, 6, 10), drum machine programming (1)
 Paul Fox – E-mu Emulator (2, 4-6, 8-10)
 John Van Tongeren – Minimoog (2), synthesizers (2, 4)
 Brock Walsh – synthesizers (2, 5), drum machine programming (2, 5)
 James Ingram – synthesizers (3),  drum machine programming (3), backing vocals (3)
 Barry Mann – synthesizers (3), drum machine programming (3) 
 Vince Melamed – Fender Rhodes (4)
 Glen Ballard – synthesizers (5), drum machine programming (5, 8)
 Andy Goldmark – synthesizer programming (7), drum machine programming (7, 9)
 Bruce Roberts – synthesizer programming (7), drum machine programming (7)
 Richard Ruttenburg – additional synthesizers (7)
 Tommy Faragher – synthesizers (5, 8), bass (8), theremin (8)
 Greg Phillinganes – Minimoog (8)
 Mark Goldenberg – guitar (2), synthesizers (8)
 Dennis Herring – guitar (2), lead guitar (5)
 David Katay – guitar (3)
 Eddie Watkins, Jr – bass (2)
 Nathan Watts – bass (3)
 Reek Havok – electronic drum programming (1, 3, 4, 6, 8)
 Bob Mithoff – drum machine programming (4, 6, 10)
 Francis Buckley – drum machine programming (5)
 Paulinho da Costa – percussion (1, 4, 5), tambourine (6)

Production
 Producer – Richard Perry
 Associate producers – Gary Skardina (track 1); Stephen Mitchell (track 1); Glen Ballard (tracks 2, 5 & 8); Brock Walsh (tracks 2, 5 & 8); Barry Mann (track 3); Howie Rice (tracks 4, 6 & 10); Bruce Roberts (track 7); Andy Goldmark (tracks 7 & 9)
 Recording engineer – Michael Brooks (tracks 1–4, 6, 8, 9 & 10)
 Basic track engineers – Gary Skardina (track 1), Frances Buckley (track 5) and Brian Elliot (track 7).
 Additional engineers – Stuart Furusho, Bobby Gerber and Hill Swimmer.
 Assistant engineers – David Dubow, Stuart Furusho and Bobby Gerber.
 Remixed by Bill Schnee
 Mastered by Stephen Marcussen at Precision Mastering (Hollywood, CA).
 Art direction and design – Kosh and Ron Larson
 Photography – Donald Miller
 Fashion coordinator – Susan Epstein

Singles
"I Need You" (7" Version) / "Operator" (Alternate Version) [12" single included extended mix of "I Need You"]
"Automatic" (7" Version) / "Nightline" (LP Version) [12" single included extended mix of "Automatic"]
"Jump (For My Love)" (7" Remix) / "Heartbeat" [12" single included extended mix of "Jump (For My Love)"]
"I'm So Excited" (7" Remix) / "Dance Electric" [12" single included extended mix of "I'm So Excited"]
"Neutron Dance" (7" Version) / "Telegraph Your Love" [12" single included extended mix of "Neutron Dance"]
"Baby Come and Get It" / "Operator" (LP Version) [12" single included extended mix of "Baby Come and Get It"]

Charts

Certifications

References

External links
 

1983 albums
The Pointer Sisters albums
Albums produced by Richard Perry
Planet Records albums
RCA Records albums